Idaea sylvestraria, the dotted border wave, is a moth of the family Geometridae. The species was first described by Jacob Hübner in 1799. It is found in Europe.

The species has a wingspan of 20–23 mm. The adults fly in July and August.

The larvae feed on dandelion and knotgrass.

Notes
The flight season refers to the British Isles. This may vary in other parts of the range.

External links

Dotted border wave at UKMoths
Fauna Europaea
Lepiforum e.V.

Sterrhini
Moths of Europe
Moths described in 1799
Taxa named by Jacob Hübner